The following is a discography of songs with production and writing credits from American rapper and record producer Missy Elliott, sorted by album, date, and title.

1993
'Raven-Symoné – Here's to New Dreams
 01. "That's What Little Girls Are Made of" (featuring Missy Elliott) (co-produced by Chad "Dr. Ceuss" Elliott)

1995
 Tony Thompson – Sexsational
 10. "Slave" (produced by DeVante Swing, additional production & written by Missy Elliott)

Jason Weaver – Stay with Me (EP)
 02. "U R the 1" (writing credit)

 Jodeci – The Show, the After Party, the Hotel
 06. "S-More" (writing credit)

Various – Dangerous Minds soundtrack
 02. Aaron Hall – "Curiosity"

1996
702 – No Doubt
 01. "Get Down Like Dat"
 02. "Steelo"
 05. "Not Gonna"
 07. "Round & Round"

Aaliyah – One in a Million
 01. "Beats 4 da Streets (Intro)" (writing credit)
 02. "Hot like Fire" (writing credit)
 03. "One in a Million" (writing credit)
 04. "A Girl Like You" (featuring Treach) (uncredited writing and vocal arrangement)
 05. "If Your Girl Only Knew" (writing credit)
 08. "4 Page Letter" (writing credit)
 13. "Heartbroken" (writing credit)
 14. "Never Comin' Back" (writing credit)
 15. "Ladies in da House" (writing credit)

Busta Rhymes – It's a Party (Vinyl)
 02. "It's a Party (AllStar Remix)" (featuring SWV) (writing credit)

Ginuwine – Ginuwine...The Bachelor
 09. "I'll Do Anything/I'm Sorry" (writing credit)
 12. "G. Thang" (writing credit)

1997
Tha Truth – Makin' Moves
 01. "Makin' Moves" (co-produced by T-Smoov)
 02. "Gotta Find... (A New Love)" (co-produced by T-Smoov)
 03. "I Wanna Know" (co-produced by Erick Sermon)
 07. "Don't Rush" (co-produced by Marc Gordon)
 08. "U Better Be Ready"
 09. "Candy" (co-produced by Marc Gordon)
 10. "How We Roll"
 11. "Red Lights"/"Bustin Out (On Funk)" (featuring Erick Sermon)

Shades – Shades
 05. "Why" (co-produced by Chad "Dr. Seuss" Elliott)

Adina Howard – Welcome to Fantasy Island
 05. "Crank Me Up"

Mariah Carey – Butterfly
 07. "Babydoll" (produced by Cory Rooney, additional production & written by Missy Elliott)

Puff Daddy & the Family – No Way Out
 10. "It's All About the Benjamins" (featuring Lil' Kim, The L.O.X. & The Notorious B.I.G.) (uncredited vocal arrangement)

SWV – Release Some Tension
 02. "Release Some Tension" (featuring Foxy Brown)
 05. "Can We" (featuring Missy Elliott) (co-produced by Timbaland)

Timbaland & Magoo – Welcome to Our World
 01. "Beep Beep" (sampling credit)
 16. "Man Undercover" (featuring Aaliyah & Missy Elliott) (co-produced by Timbaland)

1998
Melanie B – Hot
 09. "I Want You Back" (featuring Missy Elliott) (co-produced by Gerard Thomas)

MC Lyte – Seven & Seven
 01. "In My Business"
 02. "Too Fly" (featuring Pam from Total)
 12. "Want What I Got" (featuring Missy Elliott & Mocha)

Various – Cousin Skeeter
 00. 702 – "Cousin Skeeter (Theme)" 
Sample credit: 702 – "Steelo"

Yo Yo – Ebony
 03. "Do You Wanna Ride?" (featuring Kelly Price, Missy Elliott, & Lil Mo)
 10. "I Would If I Could" (featuring Missy Elliott & Lil Mo)

Elusion – Think About It
 02. "Good & Plenty"
Sample credit: Missy Elliott – "I'm Talkin'"

Nicole – Make It Hot
 02. "Seventeen" (co-produced by Gerard "Soundman" Thomas & Donald "Lenny" Holmes)
 03. "In da Street" (featuring Missy Elliott & Mocha) (co-produced by Gerard Thomas & Donald Holmes)
 09. "Nervous" (featuring Lil' Mo) (co-produced by Gerard Thomas & Donald Holmes)
 11. "Boy You Should Listen" (co-produced by Gerard Thomas & Donald Holmes)

Total – Kima, Keisha, and Pam
 01. "Trippin'" (featuring Missy Elliott) (produced with Darryl Pearson, co-production by Timbaland, Puff Daddy & Mario Winans)
 02. "I Tried"
 03. "Rock Track" (writing credit)
 10. "There Will Be No #!*@ Tonight! (Interlude)"
 11. "Do Something" (featuring Missy Elliott & Mocha)
 15. "I Don't Wanna"
 16. "Move Too Fast"

Timbaland – Tim's Bio: Life from da Bassment
 13. "Talking on the Phone" (Kelly Price featuring Missy Elliott and Lil' Man) (co-production)
 15. "John Blaze" (Aaliyah featuring Missy Elliott) (co-production)
 17. "3:30 in the Morning" (co-production)

Whitney Houston – My Love Is Your Love
 06. "In My Business" (featuring Missy Elliott) (co-produced by Kelvin Bradshaw & Lloyd Turner)
 08. "Oh Yes" (co-produced by Kelvin Bradshaw & Lloyd Turner)

Various – Why Do Fools Fall in Love soundtrack
 01. Gina Thompson – "Why Do Fools Fall in Love"	
 02. Destiny's Child – "Get on da Bus"	
 03. Coko – "He Be Back"	
 05. Missy Elliott & Busta Rhymes – "Get Contact"	
 06. Lil' Mo – "5 Minutes"	
 07. Melanie B. – "I Want U Back"	
 08. Mista – "About You"	
 12. Total – "What the Dealio"

Various – Hav Plenty soundtrack
 09. SWV – "I Wanna Be Where You Are"

Various – Dr. Dolittle soundtrack
 03. Aaliyah – "Are You That Somebody?" (uncredited)

1999
Destiny's Child – The Writing's on the Wall
 04. "Confession" (featuring Missy Elliott) (co-produced by Gerard Thomas & Lenny Holmes)
702 – 702
 02. "Where My Girls At" (co-produced by Rapture & E. Seats)	
 09. "Gotta Leave"

Missy Elliott – Da Real World
 01. "Mysterious (Intro)"
 02. "Beat Biters"
 03. "Bust Rhymes" (featuring Eminem)
 04. "All n My Grill" (featuring Big Boi and Nicole Wray)
 05. "Dangerous Mouths" (featuring Redman)
 06. "Hot Boyz"
 07. "You Don't Know" (featuring Lil' Mo)
 08. "Mr. D.J." (featuring Lady Saw)
 09. "Checkin' for You" (featuring Lil' Kim)
 10. "Stickin' Chickens" (featuring Aaliyah and Da Brat)
 11. "Smooth Chick"
 12. "We Did It"
 13. "Throw Your Hands Up" (interlude featuring Lil' Kim)
 14. "She's a Bitch"
 15. "U Can Resist" (featuring Juvenile and B.G.)
 16. "Crazy Feelings" (featuring Beyoncé)
 17. "All n My Grill" (Remix featuring MC Solaar and Nicole Wray)

Nas – I Am...
 08. "You Won't See Me Tonight" (featuring Aaliyah) (writing credit)

2000
Take 5 – Against All Odds
 02. "Hottie" (writing credit)
Originally recorded by *NSYNC

Tamar – Tamar
 03. "No Disrespect"

Tamia – A Nu Day
 03. "Can't Go for That"
 Sample credit: Hall & Oates – "I Can't Go For That (No Can Do)"
 06. "Long Distance Love"
 08. "Wanna Be"
 10. "Can't No Man"

Various – Bait soundtrack
 07. Total – "Quick Rush" (featuring Missy Elliott)

Various – Romeo Must Die soundtrack
 06. Aaliyah – "Are You Feelin' Me?" (writing credit)

2001
Various – Moulin Rouge! soundtrack
 02. Christina Aguilera, Pink, Mýa & Lil' Kim – "Lady Marmalade"

Aaliyah – Aaliyah
 06. "I Care 4 U" (writing credit)

Bubba Sparxxx – Dark Days, Bright Nights
 03. "Ugly" (featuring Timbaland & Tweet) (writing and sample credit)
Sample credit: Missy Elliott – "Get Ur Freak On"

Missy Elliott – Miss E ...So Addictive
 01. "So Addictive (Intro)" (featuring Tweet)
 02. "Dog in Heat" (featuring Redman & Method Man)
 03. "One Minute Man" (featuring Ludacris)
 04. "Lick Shots"
 05. "Get Ur Freak On"
 06. "Scream a.k.a. Itchin'"
 07. "Old School Joint"
 08. "Take Away" (featuring Ginuwine & Tweet)
 09. "4 My People" (featuring Eve)
 10. "Bus-A-Bus (Interlude)" (featuring Busta Rhymes)
 11. "Whatcha Gon' Do" (featuring Timbaland)
 12. "Step Off"
 13. "X-Tasy"
 14. "Slap! Slap! Slap!" (featuring Da Brat & Ms. Jade)
 15. "I've Changed (Interlude)" (featuring Lil' Mo)

2002
Mary J. Blige – No More Drama
 13. "Never Been"

Karen Clark Sheard – 2nd Chance
 02. "Only Call on Jesus"
 06. "Higher Ground" (featuring Yolanda Adams, Kim Burrell, Dorinda Clark Cole, Mary Mary, Tweet & Missy Elliott)

Me'Shell Ndegeocello – Cookie: The Anthropological Mixtape
 16. "Pocketbook (Remix)" (featuring Tweet & Redman) (co-produced by Rockwilder)

Code5 – Code5... The Secret's Out
 02. "Hottie" (featuring Missy Elliott & Timbaland) (co-written & vocally arranged by Lil' Mo)
 Sample credit: Take 5 – "Hottie"

Missy Elliott – Under Construction
 01. "Go to the Floor" (main production by Timbaland)
 02. "Bring the Pain" (featuring Method Man) (main production by Timbaland)
 03. "Gossip Folks" (featuring Ludacris) (main production by Timbaland)
 Sample credit: Frankie Smith – "Double Dutch Bus"
 04. "Work It" (main production by Timbaland)
 Sample credit: Rock Master Scott & the Dynamic Three – "Request Line", Run-D.M.C. – "Peter Piper"
 05. "Back in the Day" (featuring Jay-Z) (main production by Timbaland)
 06. "Funky Fresh Dressed" (featuring Ms. Jade) (main production by Timbaland)
 07. "Pussycat" (co-produced by Erroll "Poppi" McCalla, Jr.)
 08. "Nothing Out There for Me" (featuring Beyoncé) (co-produced by Craig Brockman & Nisan Stewart)
 09. "Slide" (main production by Timbaland)
 10. "Play That Beat" (main production by Timbaland)
 11. "Ain't That Funny" (main production by Timbaland)
 12. "Hot" (main production by Timbaland)
 13. "Can You Hear Me" (featuring TLC) (co-produced by Craig Brockman & Nisan Stewart)
 14. "Work It (Remix)" (featuring 50 Cent) [Hidden Track]
 15. "Drop tha Bomb"

TLC – 3D
 09. "Dirty Dirty" (co-produced by Timbaland)

Trina – Diamond Princess
 04. "Rewind That Back" (featuring Missy Elliott)
 09. "No Panties" (featuring Tweet)

Tweet – Southern Hummingbird
 13. "Call Me" (produced by Timbaland, additional production & written by Missy Elliott)
 17. "Big Spender" (produced with Troy Johnson)
 Sample credit: Sweet Charity Original Broadway Album – "Big Spender"

Whitney Houston – Just Whitney
 03. "Things You Say" (co-produced by CKB)

2003
Beyoncé – Dangerously in Love
 08. "Signs" (featuring Missy Elliott) (co-produced by Craig Brockman & Nisan Stewart)

Lil' Mo – Meet the Girl Next Door
 03. "Doing Me Wrong" (co-produced by Walter "Lil' Walt" Millsap III)

Sticky Fingaz – Decade: "...but wait it gets worse"
 04. "Can't Call It" (produced by Scott Storch, additional production & written by Missy Elliott)

Missy Elliott – This Is Not a Test!
 01. "Baby Girl Interlude"/"Intro" (featuring Mary J. Blige) (produced with Timbaland)
 Sample credit: The Sugarhill Gang – "Rappers Delight"
 02. "Bomb Intro"/"Pass That Dutch" (produced with Timbaland)
 Sample credit: Eric Burdon & War – "Magic Mountain", De La Soul – "Potholes in My Lawn"
 03. "Wake Up" (featuring Jay-Z) (produced with Timbaland)
 04. "Keep It Movin" (featuring Elephant Man) (produced with Timbaland)
 05. "Is This Our Last Time" (featuring Fabolous) (co-produced by Soul Diggaz)
 Sample credit: Shalamar – "Second Time Around"
 06. "Ragtime Interlude"/"I'm Really Hot" (co-produced by Craig Brockmanproduced with Timbaland)
 07. "Dats What I'm Talkin About" (featuring R. Kelly) (co-produced by Craig Brockman & Nisan Stewart)
 08. "Don't Be Cruel" (featuring Monica & Beenie Man) (produced with Timbaland)
 Sample credit: Michael Zager – "Let's All Chant", Salt-n-Pepa – "Push It"
 09. "Toyz Interlude"/"Toyz"  (co-produced by Timbaland & Craig Brockman)
 10. "Let It Bump" (produced with Timbaland)
 Sample credit: MC Lyte – "Cram to Understand U", Rod Temperton – "Ain't No Half Steppin'"
 11. "Pump It Up" (featuring Nelly) (produced with Timbaland)
 12. "It's Real" (co-produced by Craig Brockman)
 Sample credit: Rufus & Chaka Khan – "Have a Good Time"
 13. "Let Me Fix My Weave" (produced with Timbaland)
 14. "Spelling Bee Interlude"/"Spelling Bee" (produced with Timbaland)
 15. "I'm Not Perfect" (featuring The Clark Sisters) (co-produced by Craig Brockman & Nisan Stewart)
 Sample credit: "This Christmas"
 16. "Outro" (produced with Timbaland)

Karen Clark Sheard – The Heavens Are Telling
 07. "Go Ahead" (featuring Missy Elliott)

Monica – After the Storm
 01. "Intro"
 02. "Get It Off" (featuring Dirtbag) (co-produced by DJ Scratchator)
 Sample credit: Strafe – "Set It Off"
 03. "So Gone" (co-produced by Spike & Jamahl)
 Sample credit: The Whispers – "You Are Number One"
 06. "Knock Knock" (co-produced by Kanye West)
 Sample credit: The Masqueraders – "It's a Terrible Thing to Waste Your Love"
 13. "Outro" (co-produced by Craig Brockman)

Mýa – Moodring
 01. "My Love Is Like...Wo" (co-produced by CKB, additional production by Ron Fair)
 04. "Step" (co-produced by Timbaland)

Various – Honey soundtrack
 01. "Hurt Sumthin'"
 08. "Thugman" (Tweet featuring Missy Elliott)

Various – The Fighting Temptations soundtrack
 01. "Fighting Temptation" (Beyoncé, Missy Elliott, MC Lyte & Free)
 Sample credit: Uncle Louie – "I Like Funky Music"

2004
213 – The Hard Way
 19. "So Fly"
 Sample credit: Monica – "So Gone"

Angie Stone – Stone Love
 04. "U-Haul" (co-produced by Craig Brockman & Nisan Stewart)

Ciara – Goodies
 02. "1, 2 Step" (co-written by Ciara & Jazze Pha)

Fantasia Barrino – Free Yourself
 02. "Free Yourself" (co-produced by Craig Brockman)
 04. "Selfish (I Want You to Myself)" (featuring Missy Elliott)
 09. "Good Lovin'"

Various – Shark's Tale
 02. "Car Wash" (Christina Aguilera featuring Missy Elliott) (additional production by Christina Aguilera, Ron Fair, T. Herzberg, C. Styles, Bang Out, Silence)

2005
Missy Elliott – The Cookbook
 04. "Lose Control" (featuring Ciara & Fatman Scoop)
 Sample credit: Cybotron – "Clear", Hot Streak – "Body Work"
 09. "Remember When"

Tweet – It's Me Again
 02. "Turn da Lights Off" (featuring Missy Elliott) (co-produced by Kwamé)
 Sample credit: Nat King Cole's – "Lost April", Marvin Gaye and Tammi Terrell – "If This World Were Mine"
 05. "You" (co-produced by Soul Diggaz)
 Sample credit: Louis Armstrong – "Stardust"
 07. "Things I Don't Mean" (featuring Missy Elliott) (co-produced by Craig Brockman)
 08. "My Man" (co-produced by Craig Brockman)
 09. "Sports, Sex & Food" (co-produced by Soul Diggaz)
 Sample credit: The Meters – "Hey Pocky A-Way"
 16. "We Don't Need No Water" (featuring Missy Elliott)
 Sample credit: Rock Master Scott & the Dynamic Three – "The Roof Is on Fire", Mandrill – "Mango Meat"

2006
Fantasia – Fantasia
 08. "I'm Not That Type" (co-produced by Lamb)
 10. "Two Weeks Notice" (co-produced by Craig Brockman)
 14. "Bump What Your Friends Say" (co-produced by Soul Diggaz, Phil Lees)

Monica – The Makings of Me
 02. "Dozen Roses (You Remind Me)" (co-produced by David "Davey Boy" Lindsey & Cliff Jones)
 Sample credit: Curtis Mayfield – "The Makings of You"
 06. "Doin' Me Right" (co-produced by Lamb & Miguel "Pro" Castro)
 Sample credit: The Whispers – "Chocolate Girl"
 09. "Gotta Move on" (co-produced by Craig Brockman)

2007
Keyshia Cole – Just Like You
 03. "Let It Go" (featuring Missy Elliott & Lil' Kim)
 Sample credit: Mtume – "Juicy Fruit", Yarborough and Peoples – "Don't Stop the Music"

2008
Jazmine Sullivan – Fearless
 02. "Need U Bad" (co-produced by Lamb)
 Sample credit: Nicholas Taylor Stanton – "Higher Mediation Riddim Version", Tapper Zukie – "Papa Big Shirt"
 08. "Dream Big" (co-produced by Lamb)
 Sample credit: Daft Punk – "Veridis Quo"

Jennifer Hudson – Jennifer Hudson
 08. "I'm His Only Woman" (featuring Fantasia Barrino) (co-produced by Jack Splash)

Jessica Betts – Jessie Pearl
 03. "Block"
 05. "Whisper"
 Sample credit: Ying Yang Twins – "Wait (The Whisper Song)"
 08. "Moon" (co-produced by Soul Diggaz)

2009
Angie Stone – Unexpected
 10. "Think Sometimes"

2010
Monica – Still Standing
 03. "Everything to Me" (co-produced by Lamb)
 Sample credit: Deniece Williams – "Silly"
 06. "If You Were My Man" (co-produced by Lamb)
 Sample credit: Evelyn "Champagne" King – "Betcha She Don't Love You"
 11. "Blackberry"

Jazmine Sullivan – Love Me Back
 01. "Holding You Down (Goin' In Circles)" (co-produced by Lamb)
 Sample credit: Slick Rick & Doug E. Fresh – "La Di Da Di", Mary J. Blige – "Be Happy", Audio Two – "Top Billin'", Biz Markie – "Make the Music with Your Mouth, Biz", Nas – "Affirmative Action"
 07. "Excuse Me" (co-produced by Lamb)
 Sample credit: The Manhattans – "Take It or Leave It"
 12. "Luv Back"

2012

Monica – New Life
 08. "Until It's Gone"
 16. "Anything (To Find You)" (featuring Rick Ross)
 Sample credit: The Notorious B.I.G. – "Who Shot Ya
02  "Niliria" (늴리리야; Nililiya) - G-Dragon

2014
Sharaya J – Takin' It No More single
 01. "Takin' It No More" (additional production, produced by DJ Jayhood)
Sample credit: Missy Elliott – "Take Away" (featuring Ginuwine & Kameelah "Meelah" Williams of 702)
 02. "Shut It Down" (co-produced by Aaron "Dboy" Monroe)

2015
Monica – Code Red
 00. "Code Red" (featuring Missy Elliott & Laiyah Brown)
 00. "I Love Him"

2016
Missy Elliott – Block Party
 00. "9th Inning" (featuring Timbaland) (additional production, produced by Timbaland & Jerome "J-Roc" Harmon)
 00. "Pin the Tail" (co-produced by Timbaland)
 00. "Blow Ya Whistle" (co-produced by Souldiggaz)
 00. "Talk a Lotta Trash" (co-produced by Alicia "4Bia" Cherry)
 00. "Pre Madonna/Prima Donna" (co-produced by Timbaland)
 00. "Bounce It Up and Down" (co-produced by Timbaland)
 00. "Rather" (co-produced by Lamb)

Tweet — Charlene
 06. "Somebody Else Will" (featuring Missy Elliott) (co-produced by Timbaland)

Fifth Harmony — 7/27
 10. "Not That Kinda Girl" (featuring Missy Elliott) (writing credit)

2018
Normani - TBA
 00. Untitled

2019
Missy Elliott –  Iconology
 01. "Throw It Back" (writing credit)
 02. "Cool Off" (writing credit)
 03. "DripDemeanor" (featuring Sum1) (writing credit) and (co-produced by Timbaland)
 04. "Why I Still Love You" (writing credit)
 05. "Why I Still Love You" (Acapella) (writing credit)

2020
Toni Braxton - TBA
 00. "Do It (Remix)" (featuring Missy Elliott) (co-produced by Hannon Lane)

Unreleased / Non-album songs
702
 "Speakers Blow" (featuring Missy Elliott)
 "Gotta Leave (Remix)" (featuring Missy Elliott)

Aaliyah
 "Sugar & Spice" (featuring Missy Elliott & Timbaland) (writing credit)
 "Where Could He Be" (featuring Missy Elliott & Tweet) (co-produced by Bink)
 Sample credit: Lisa Stansfield – "All Around the World"

Blaque – Torch
 02. "Ugly" (featuring Missy Elliott) (co-produced by CKB, Craig Brockman, Dante Nolen, Nisan Stewart)
 03. "Freakazoid"
 09. "Nappy Dugout"
 10. "Dat's Right"
 15. "No Ganksta"
 00. "Lingerie"

Cheri Dennis
 "Wrapped Around Me" (co-produced by Timbaland)

Eminem
 "Tylenol Island" (co-produced by Timbaland)
 Sample credit: Nicole Wray – "Bangin' (Don't Lie)"

Fantasia
 "Clap Ya Hands" (featuring Missy Elliott)
 "Turn This Party Up" (featuring Missy Elliott)
 "No Stoppin'"

Janet Jackson
 "Nasty Girl 2000" (featuring Missy Elliott & Aaliyah)
 "Almond Joy" (co-produced by Nisan Stewart)

Jazmine Sullivan –  Break My Little Heart
 00. "Break My Little Heart"
 00. "Don't Let Me Get Started"
 00. "Feel Nice"
 00. "Backstabbers" (co-produced by Timbaland)
 00. "Where Did He Go? (Bus Stop)"

Jessica Betts
 "You Don't Have To" (co-produced by Souldiggaz)

Missy Elliott
 "What U Say" (featuring LaTocha Scott)
 "Come On Back"
 "Release the Tension"
 "Can We" (SWV demo)
 "Drop tha Bomb"
 "Let's Get Married" (co-produced by Timbaland)
 "It's a Woman's World"
 "Sexy Enough" (featuring Free & Raje Shwari)
 "Pussycat" (Remix) (featuring Janet Jackson & Lil' Kim)
 "Swing Your Partner" (featuring Eve)
 "I Want You Back" (Mel B demo)

Mocha – Bella Mafia
 "I Know Whutchu Like" (featuring Petey Pablo, Lil' Mo, & Missy Elliott) (co-produced by Rockwilder)

Monica
 "Best Friends"
 "Girl, Please"
 "No Stoppin'"
 "Let Me Know" (featuring Missy Elliott)

Nicole – Elektric Blue
 00. "Bangin' (Don't Lie)" (featuring Prodigy of Mobb Deep) (writing credit)
 00. "Single Life (Interlude)" (featuring Missy Elliott)
 00. "Last Night a DJ..." (featuring Missy Elliott)

Olivia
 "Cherry Pop"
 "Not Alone"

Sarah Jo Martin
 "Fuck You" (co-produced by Timbaland)
 "I'm About to Lose It" (co-produced by Timbaland)
 "I'm Your Slave" (co-produced by Timbaland)
 "Put the Gun Down" (co-produced by Timbaland)

So Def
 "Navigator"
 "I Like It"
 "Hell Naw"
 "Happy Birthday" (featuring Izza Kizza & Missy Elliott) (co-produced by Souldiggaz)

Timbaland – The World Is Ours
 "The World Is Ours" (featuring Missy Elliott, Justin Timberlake, Kiley Dean & Bubba Sparxxx) (co-written by Justin Timberlake)

Torrey Carter – The Life I Live
 01. "Floss Ya Jewels"
 02. "Take That" (featuring Missy Elliott) (co-produced by Charlamagne)
 04. "The Life I Wanna Live" (featuring Nokio of Dru Hill) (co-produced by Nokio)
 08. "Now I Got a Girl" (co-produced & co-written by Lil Mo)
 09. "Same 'Ol" (featuring Missy Elliott) (co-produced by Timbaland)

Total
 "Trippin' (Missy's Mix)"

Tweet
 "Shook Up" (featuring Free)
 "Mr. DJ" (featuring Missy Elliott) (co-produced by Soul Diggaz)
 "Procrastination" (featuring Missy Elliott & Timbaland) (co-produced by Timbaland)

References

External links
 

Production discographies
Production discography
Hip hop discographies
Discographies of American artists